The 1976 Detroit Lions season was the 47th season in franchise history. After the first four games of the season, Rick Forzano resigned under pressure of owner William Clay Ford, and was replaced by one time Brigham Young University head coach and Lions assistant Tommy Hudspeth. In spite of a stellar season by quarterback Greg Landry, that year's NFL Comeback Player Of The Year, the team was still mired in mediocrity, finishing 6–8.

NFL Draft 

Notes

 Detroit were awarded a first-round pick (8th) from Los Angeles as compensation for the Rams signing Lions free agent WR Ron Jessie. During the draft, Detroit traded this 8th pick to Chicago in exchange for the Bears' first- and third-round picks (10th and 68th).
 Detroit were awarded a second-round pick (46th) from San Diego as compensation for the Chargers signing Lions free agent C Ed Flanagan.
 Detroit traded its fourth-round pick (108th) to Miami in exchange for LB Larry Ball and the Dolphins' fifth-round pick (145th).
 Detroit traded its fifth-round pick (140th) to San Francisco in exchange for QB Joe Reed.
 Detroit traded its sixth-round pick (170th) to New England in exchange for C Jon Morris.
 Detroit traded FB Leon Crosswhite to New England in exchange for the Patriots' eighth-round pick (217th) and sixth-round pick in 1975.

Roster

Regular season 
On November 25, O.J. Simpson of the Buffalo Bills set a record with the most rushing yards in a Thanksgiving Day game, by rushing for 273 yards against the Lions.

In spite of their poor overall record the Lions offense set a statistical record for Passer Rating Differential (40.9, 14th best 1960 to 2011). Such a high rating is usually reserved for playoff teams or Super Bowl winners.

Schedule 

!Note: Intra-division opponents are in bold text.

Season summary

Week 1 at Bears

Week 2 vs Falcons

Week 4 at Packers

Standings

References 

 Detroit Lions on Pro Football Reference
 Detroit Lions on jt-sw.com
 Detroit Lions on The Football Database

Detroit Lions
Detroit Lions seasons
Detroit Lions